Paul Barth may refer to:

 Paul Barth (sociologist) (1858–1922), German philosopher and sociological writer
 Paul C. Barth (1858–1907), Mayor of Louisville, Kentucky
 Paul Barth (fencer) (1921–1974), Swiss fencer
 Paul Barth, Vice President of the National Guitar Corporation
 Paul Barth (judoka) (born 1945), German former judoka